"Extra Innings" is the thirty-seventh episode and the second episode of the third season (1988–89) of the television series The Twilight Zone. In this episode, a retired baseball player takes on the life of a long-dead baseball player by stepping into his trading card.

Plot
A down-and-out, injured baseball player named Ed Hamner tries to maintain his love for baseball by chatting and trading baseball cards with his teenage neighbor Paula, who shows potential as a player herself, but his wife Cindy insists that baseball is a children's game and wants him to spend all his time getting a job in an unrelated field. Paula finds an old baseball card of a player from 1909-10 named Monte Hanks, who not only happens to resemble Ed, but has identical rookie year stats. Ed is impressed that Hanks got 7 home runs in his second year, his final year before a baseball to the head ended his life. After a fight with Cindy about Ed missing a job interview so that he could cheer Paula on at an important game, Ed goes to sleep and awakens to discover the card magically growing to the size of a door. Ed steps into it to find himself in the uniform of Monte Hanks. He no longer has an injury and is ready to play baseball.

Ed tells Paula he went back in time 78 years and played ball without the use of his cane, showing as proof that Hanks's card now shows 8 home runs. He takes her with him into the card, and she watches him play baseball in the past. After returning to the present, Paula and Ed are excited that Ed is going to play in the World Series. Cindy arranges for her and Ed to go to a dinner party where he will meet prospective employers the evening after the World Series.

Paula tells Ed she cannot go to the game with him because of an orthodontist appointment, but wonders whether or not Ed belongs in 1910. He seems happier there. The game runs late, and Ed opts to skip out on the dinner party so he can finish it. Cindy finds Ed gone and burns his card collection in anger. Paula comes in and saves the Monte Hanks card. Hearing Cindy's bitter words about Ed, Paula realizes Cindy does not truly understand or care about Ed, so she tears the card in half in order to keep Ed in 1910. At home, she looks at the torn card, and is delighted as it magically fills with impressive statistics for the years succeeding 1910.

External links
 

1988 American television episodes
The Twilight Zone (1985 TV series season 3) episodes
Television episodes about time travel
Fiction set in 1910
Fiction set in 1988
Baseball on television in the United States

fr:La Seconde Chance (La Cinquième Dimension)